The following is a list of graded stakes races held at Churchill Downs in Louisville, Kentucky:

 
Churchill Downs
Churchill Downs
Churchill Downs